Aegilops umbellulata (syn. Triticum umbellulatum (Zhuk.) Bowden, Kiharapyrum umbellulatum (Zhuk.) Á.Löve, Aegilops ovata var. anatolica Eig) is a species in the family Poaceae.

External links
GrainGenes Species Report: Aegilops umbellulata
USDA Plants Profile: Aegilops umbellulata

umbellulata